Gya or Gia is a village in the Leh district of Ladakh in India. It is located in the Kharu tehsil, off the Leh–Manali Highway, close to Tso Kar.

The village overlooks the Gya river in the Ladakh region, between the Indus river valley and Tanglang La Pass on the Leh-Manali Highway. Accessible from Upshi in the Indus River Valley, the village is located in the gorge created by the River Gya. A Buddhist Gompa with accompanying chortens or stupas is situated above the village and the gorge.

Most of the people are engaged in agriculture adopting organic farming. The village is still protected with its old heritage and culture for which countless tourist love to visit there.

Demographics
According to the 2011 census of India, Gya has 140 households. The effective literacy rate (i.e. the literacy rate of population excluding children aged 6 and below) is 58.67%.

References

Villages in Kharu tehsil